Spin Out is a 2016 Australian romantic comedy film directed by Tim Ferguson and Marc Gracie and starring Xavier Samuel and Morgan Griffin.

Plot synopsis
Billy (Xavier Samuel) and Lucy (Morgan Griffin) grew up together in a small town in Australia, where they form one of the town's most formidable ute driving teams. Lucy declares she is moving to the city after Billy makes a risky car stunt, sending him into a spin. Amid the mayhem of the town's annual Bachelor and Spinster Ball, Billy only has one night to reveal his true feelings to his best friend or lose her forever.

Cast
Xavier Samuel as Billy
Morgan Griffin as Lucy
Lincoln Lewis as Nic
Melissa Bergland as Mary
Christie Whelan Browne as Sacha
Lisa Kowalski as Shazza
Eddie Baroo as Hammerhead Carney
Travis Jeffery as Sparrow McGee
PiaGrace Moon as Taylah
Mark Nicholson as Tubby
Tessa James as Kimba
Brendan Bacon as JJ
Thomas Blackburne as Rooter
Dorje Swallow as Podge
Aileen Huynh as Merline

Reception
Reviews for the film had mostly been negative. The film holds a 13% rotten rating on review aggregator Rotten Tomatoes, with an average score of 3.7/10. Leigh Paatsch of the Herald Sun gave the film a rating of 1 and said "How did this ever get made? And when will it ever end?" Jake Wilson of The Sydney Morning Herald gave it 2 stars and described it as "the glamorised version of rural Australia we're used to seeing on commercial TV." He stated that Samuel's character was the opposite to how he's made out in the film, as a "good-looking captain" instead of a rugged outdoor type he is described as.

References

External links

Spin Out on Rotten Tomatoes

Australian romantic comedy films
2016 films
2016 romantic comedy films
2010s English-language films
Screen Australia films
2010s Australian films